Wolfgang Haken (June 21, 1928 – October 2, 2022) was a German American mathematician who specialized in topology, in particular 3-manifolds.

Biography
Haken was born on June 21, 1928 in Berlin, Germany. His father was Werner Haken, a physicist who had Max Planck as a doctoral thesis advisor. In 1953, Haken earned a Ph.D. degree in mathematics from Christian-Albrechts-Universität zu Kiel (Kiel University) and married Anna-Irmgard von Bredow, who earned a Ph.D. degree in mathematics from the same university in 1959. In 1962, they left Germany so he could accept a position as visiting professor at the University of Illinois at Urbana-Champaign. He became a full professor in 1965, retiring in 1998.
 
In 1976, together with colleague Kenneth Appel at the University of Illinois at Urbana-Champaign, Haken solved the four-color theorem. They proved that any two-dimensional map, with certain limitations, can be filled in with four colors without any adjacent “countries” sharing the same color. Haken has introduced several ideas, including Haken manifolds, Kneser-Haken finiteness, and an expansion of the work of Kneser into a theory of normal surfaces. Much of his work has an algorithmic aspect, and he is a figure in algorithmic topology. One of his key contributions to this field is an algorithm to detect if a knot is unknotted.

Haken's eldest son, Armin, proved that there exist propositional tautologies that require resolution proofs of exponential size. Haken's eldest daughter, Dorothea Blostein, is a professor of computer science, known for her discovery of the master theorem for divide-and-conquer recurrences. Haken’s second son, Lippold, is the inventor of the Continuum Fingerboard. Haken’s youngest son, Rudolf, is a professor of music, who established the world's first Electric Strings university degree program at the University of Illinois at Urbana-Champaign. Wolfgang is the cousin of Hermann Haken, a physicist known for laser theory and synergetics. 

In 1978, Haken delivered an invited address at the International Congress of Mathematicians in Helsinki. He was a recipient of the 1979 Fulkerson Prize of the American Mathematical Society for his solution with Appel of the four-color theorem.

Haken died in Champaign, Illinois on October 2, 2022, aged 94.

See also
 Unknotting problem

References

 Haken, W. "Theorie der Normalflachen." Acta Math. 105, 245–375, 1961.

External links
 Wolfgang Haken memorial website
 
 Haken's faculty page at the University of Illinois at Urbana-Champaign
 Wolfgang Haken biography from World of Mathematics
 Lippold Haken's life story
 
 

1928 births
2022 deaths
Topologists
University of Illinois Urbana-Champaign faculty
University of Kiel alumni
German emigrants to the United States
Scientists from Berlin